In theoretical physics, the Wess–Zumino model has become the first known example of an interacting four-dimensional quantum field theory with linearly realised supersymmetry. In 1974, Julius Wess and Bruno Zumino studied, using modern terminology, dynamics of a single chiral superfield (composed of a complex scalar and a spinor fermion) whose cubic superpotential leads to a renormalizable theory. 

The treatment in this article largely follows that of Figueroa-O'Farrill's lectures on supersymmetry, and to some extent of Tong.

The model is an important model in supersymmetric quantum field theory. It is arguably the simplest supersymmetric field theory in four dimensions, and is ungauged.

The Wess–Zumino action

Preliminary treatment

Spacetime and matter content 

In a preliminary treatment, the theory is defined on flat spacetime (Minkowski space). For this article, the metric has mostly plus signature. The matter content is a real scalar field , a real pseudoscalar field , and a real (Majorana) spinor field . 

This is a preliminary treatment in the sense that the theory is written in terms of familiar scalar and spinor fields which are functions of spacetime, without developing a theory of superspace or superfields, which appear later in the article.

Free, massless theory 

The Lagrangian of the free, massless Wess–Zumino model is

where 
 
 
The corresponding action is
.

Massive theory 

Supersymmetry is preserved when adding a mass term of the form

Interacting theory 

Supersymmetry is preserved when adding an interaction term with coupling constant :

The full Wess–Zumino action is then given by putting these Lagrangians together:

Alternative expression 

There is an alternative way of organizing the fields. Defining the superpotential 

the Wess–Zumino action can also be written (possibly after relabelling some constant factors)

Using superspace and superfields

Superspace and superfield content 

Superspace consists of the direct sum of Minkowski space with 'spin space', a four dimensional space with coordinates , where  are indices taking values in  More formally, superspace is constructed as the space of right cosets of the Lorentz group in the super-Poincaré group.

The fact there is only 4 'spin coordinates' means that this is a theory with what is known as  supersymmetry, corresponding to an algebra with a single supercharge. The  dimensional superspace is sometimes written , and called super Minkowski space. The 'spin coordinates' are so called not due to any relation to angular momentum, but because they are treated as anti-commuting numbers, a property typical of spinors in quantum field theory due to the spin statistics theorem.

A superfield  is then a function on superspace, . 

Defining the supercovariant derivative

a chiral superfield satisfies  The field content is then simply a single chiral superfield.

However, the chiral superfield contains  fields, in the sense that it admits the expansion

Free, massless action 

When written in terms of the chiral superfield , the action (for the free, massless Wess–Zumino model) takes on the simple form

where  are integrals over spinor dimensions of superspace.

Superpotential 

Masses and interactions are added through a superpotential. The Wess–Zumino superpotential is

Since  is complex, to ensure the action is real its conjugate must also be added. 
The full Wess–Zumino action is written

Supersymmetry of the action

Preliminary treatment 

The action is invariant under the supersymmetry transformations, given in infinitesimal form by

The alternative form is invariant under the transformation

.

Without developing a theory of superspace transformations, these symmetries appear ad-hoc.

Superfield treatment 

If the action can be written as

where  is a real superfield, that is, then the action is invariant under supersymmetry.

Then the reality of  means it is invariant under supersymmetry.

Extra classical symmetries

Superconformal symmetry 
The massless Wess–Zumino model admits a larger set of symmetries, described at the algebra level by the superconformal algebra. As well as the Poincaré symmetry generators and the supersymmetry translation generators, this contains the conformal algebra as well as a conformal supersymmetry generator . 

R-symmetry 

The  R-symmetry of  supersymmetry holds when the superpotential  is a monomial. This means either , so that the superfield  is massive but free (non-interacting), or  so the theory is massless but (possibly) interacting.

This is broken at the quantum level by anomalies.

Action for multiple chiral superfields 
The most general renormalizable theory is

where the superpotential is 
,
where implicit summation is used. 

By a change of coordinates, under which  transforms under , one can set  without loss of generality. With this choice, the expression  is known as the canonical Kähler potential. There is residual freedom to make a unitary transformation in order to diagonalise the mass matrix .

When , if the multiplet is massive then the Weyl fermion has a Majorana mass. But for  the two Weyl fermions can have a Dirac mass, when the superpotential is taken to be
 This theory has a  symmetry, where  rotate with opposite charges

Super QCD 

For general , a superpotential of the form  has a  symmetry when  rotate with opposite charges, that is under 

.

This symmetry can be gauged and coupled to supersymmetric Yang–Mills to form a supersymmetric analogue to quantum chromodynamics, known as super QCD.

Supersymmetric sigma models 

If renormalizability is not insisted upon, then there are two possible generalizations. The first of these is to consider more general superpotentials. The second is to consider  in the kinetic term

The action is invariant under transformations : these are known as Kähler transformations.

Considering this theory gives an intersection of Kähler geometry with supersymmetric field theory.

where
  is the Kähler metric. It is invariant under Kähler transformations. If the kinetic term is positive definite, then  is invertible, allowing the inverse metric  to be defined.

and 

 The Riemann curvature tensor (adapted for a Kähler metric) is defined .

Adding a superpotential 
A superpotential  can be added to form the more general action

.

See also 
 N = 4 supersymmetric Yang–Mills theory
 Supermultiplet

References 

Supersymmetric quantum field theory